WATD-FM (95.9 FM) is a radio station carrying local news and features for the South Shore of Massachusetts (comprising Norfolk and Plymouth counties), with an adult contemporary music format. Founded and owned by local entrepreneur Edward Perry and licensed to Marshfield, Massachusetts, the station went live on December 6, 1977.

Programming
WATD-FM airs a news program in morning drive on weekdays, with features from AP Radio. AC hits from the 1960s-today predominate in the midday hours and in afternoon drive on weekdays, while oldies, alternative, jazz, and talk shows fill the rest of the programming week.  WATD-FM's midday and afternoon music programming featured a classic hits format until 2012, when the addition of current music shifted the format to adult contemporary. It was later added to the Nielsen BDS AC indicator panel.  WATD-FM is one of three AC stations in the Boston market, along with WMJX and WPLM-FM. The station is currently being simulcast by WBMS (AM) 1460 and its FM translator station in W266DA (101.1) Brockton, Massachusetts, a station which Marshfield Broadcasting acquired in 2015 and held the call letters WATD (AM) from 2016 to 2019.

WATD-FM also carries live coverage of University of Massachusetts-Amherst football and men's basketball games as well as live broadcasts of local high-school football and boys' basketball games involving high schools in the station's coverage area. WATD-FM has previously broadcast some high-school hockey playoff games over the course of many years.

WATD aired blues for 26 years nightly on "Wide World of Blues" with Peter Black. The program aired for the final time on July 20, 2018.

References

External links

ATD-FM
Radio stations established in 1977
Marshfield, Massachusetts
Mass media in Plymouth County, Massachusetts
Full service radio stations in the United States